Savannah Lighthouse was a lighthouse in Georgia, 
United States, off the entrance to Savannah River, Georgia. It was the second tower to be demolished after a collision with a foreign-flagged freighter.

History
The Savannah Texas Tower was constructed and placed in operation in 1964, and was built to be an automated light, controlled by the personnel at the Tybee Island Light Station.

In 1996, it became the second Texas Tower to be demolished after a collision with a foreign-flagged freighter, the first instance being the Ambrose Light (aka the Ambrose Tower).  In the case of the Savannah structure, the Singapore container ship Neptune Jade struck the tower in November 1996.  The collision sheared off and destroyed the entire structure. A buoy marked the wreckage until a salvage company was contracted to retrieve the wreckage off the ocean floor for scrapping.

References

Lighthouses completed in 1922
Lighthouses completed in 1964
Lighthouses in Georgia (U.S. state)
Buildings and structures in Savannah, Georgia
1922 establishments in Georgia (U.S. state)